Spain participated in the Eurovision Song Contest 2018 with the song "Tu canción", written by Raúl Gómez and Sylvia Santoro. The song was performed by Amaia Romero and Alfred García. The Spanish broadcaster Televisión Española (TVE) used the ninth series of reality television talent competition Operación Triunfo as the platform to select the Spanish entry for the 2018 contest in Lisbon, Portugal. Amaia and Alfred with "Tu canción" were selected by the vote of the Spanish public from among nine competing entries.

As a member of the "Big Five", Spain automatically qualified to compete in the final of the Eurovision Song Contest. Performing in position 2, Spain placed twenty-third out of the 26 participating countries with 61 points.

Background 

The nation has won the contest on two occasions: in 1968 with the song "La, la, la" performed by Massiel and in 1969 with the song "Vivo cantando" performed by Salomé, the latter having won in a four-way tie with France, the Netherlands and the United Kingdom. Spain has also finished second four times, with Karina in 1971, Mocedades in 1973, Betty Missiego in 1979 and Anabel Conde in 1995. In 2017, Spain placed twenty-sixth and last with the song "Do It for Your Lover" performed by Manel Navarro.

The Spanish national broadcaster, Televisión Española (TVE), broadcasts the event within Spain and organises the selection process for the nation's entry. TVE confirmed their intentions to participate at the 2018 Eurovision Song Contest on 1 September 2017. The Spanish broadcaster had used both national finals and internal selection to choose the Spanish entry in the past. For 2017, TVE selected the entry that would compete at the Eurovision Song Contest via the multi-artist national final Objetivo Eurovisión 2017. From 2002 to 2004, the reality television singing competition Operación Triunfo (the Spanish version of Star Academy) was used to select the artist and song to represent Spain in the contest. On 26 April 2017, TVE announced that they had commissioned a new season of Operación Triunfo, which premiered on 23 October 2017 returning to TVE after 13 years. On 4 December 2017, TVE confirmed that the ongoing series would serve as the platform to select the Spanish entrant at the 2018 contest.

Before Eurovision

Operación Triunfo 2017

Operación Triunfo is a Spanish reality television music competition consisting of training sixteen contestants in a boarding academy in order to find new singing talent. The ninth series, also known as Operación Triunfo 2017, took place from 23 October 2017 to 5 February 2018 at the Parc Audiovisual de Catalunya in Terrassa, Barcelona, hosted by Roberto Leal. The competition was broadcast on La 1, TVE International as well as online via TVE's official website rtve.es. During the sixth live show (Gala 6) on 4 December 2017, Leal announced that the Spanish entry for the 2018 Eurovision Song Contest would be selected from the contestants competing on the ongoing series. The same method was used in the 2002, 2003 and 2004 editions. On 20 December 2017, TVE announced that the five contestants that would advance to the series' final would compete in the Eurovision selection show, Gala Eurovisión, on 29 January 2018. It was later announced that the contestant placed sixth would also compete in Gala Eurovisión as part of a duet combination. The six contestants performed nine songs in Gala Eurovisión and the winner was decided exclusively through a public vote.

Contestants 
Operación Triunfo 2017 featured eighteen novel solo artists as contestants, of which sixteen were selected to enter "The Academy" following the introduction live show (Gala 0) on 23 October 2017. During each regular weekly live shows (galas), the contestants were assigned a popular song to perform in a duet or solo. The public votes via telephone, SMS and the official Operación Triunfo app, and the contestant with the most votes is exempt for nominations. The show's judging panel nominates four contestants for eviction, from which the Academy's staff and the safe contestants each saves one nominee. The two remaining nominees each perform of a song of their choice during the next live show, where one of the contestants is saved by the public. The first four finalists were decided during Gala 11 on 15 January 2018. Alfred, Amaia and Miriam were selected by the judging panel while Aitana was selected by the Academy teachers. The fifth finalist, Ana Guerra, was decided by the public during Gala 12 on 22 January 2018. The top five classified contestants qualified for Gala Eurovisión as soloists, while Agoney, who placed sixth, participated in Gala Eurovisión as part of a duet combination.

 Contestant qualified to "Gala Eurovisión"

Competing entries 
Circa 200 original songs were submitted by music publishers, independent songwriters as well as specific artists and songwriters invited by TVE for Gala Eurovisión. The Academy teachers evaluated the songs received and selected nine songs. The nine songs were then allocated to the top six classified contestants of Operación Triunfo 2017. The top five contestants were each allocated one song as solo artists, three songs were allocated to duet combinations, and the remaining song "Camina", written by the sixteen official contestants of Operación Triunfo 2017 together with the series' musical director Manu Guix, was performed by the five finalists as a group. The competing songs and the allocations were announced on 23 January 2018. Prior to Gala Eurovisión, the competing songwriters together with the Academy teachers coached the contestants in order to prepare their performances.

Gala Eurovisión 
Gala Eurovisión took place on 29 January 2018. The winner was selected through two rounds of public voting via telephone, SMS and the official Operación Triunfo app. In the first round, the top three entries advanced to the second round. In the second round, the winner, "Tu canción" performed by Alfred and Amaia was selected. Gala Eurovisión was watched by 3.086 million viewers in Spain, making it the most watched Spanish national final since 2004.

The four members of the expert panel that commented on the entries were:

 Víctor Escudero – Editor at the official Eurovision Song Contest site eurovision.tv
 Luísa Sobral – Portuguese singer, songwriter, winning songwriter of the Eurovision Song Contest 2017
 Julia Varela – Journalist at RTVE, commentator of the Eurovision Song Contest for Spain
  – Musician, music executive and artistic director at Universal Music Spain

In addition to the performances of the competing entries, guest performers included Luísa Sobral performing "Cupido", winner of the Eurovision Song Contest 2014 for Austria Conchita Wurst performing "Rise Like a Phoenix", J Balvin performing a medley of "Machika" and "Mi Gente", and the eliminated contestants of Operación Triunfo 2017 performing the Eurovision winning songs for Spain "La, la, la" and "Vivo cantando". Manel Navarro who represented Spain in the Eurovision Song Contest 2017 was also present to announce the winner.

Preparation
The official video of the song, directed by Gus Carballo, was filmed in February 2018 at studio in Madrid. The video premiered on 9 March 2018 on a special prime time broadcast on La 1, hosted by Roberto Leal. The music video served as the official preview video for the Spanish entry.

Promotion
Amaia y Alfred made appearances across Europe to specifically promote "Tu canción" as the Spanish Eurovision entry. On 5 April, they performed during the London Eurovision Party, which was held at the Café de Paris venue in London, United Kingdom. They also performed during the Israel Calling event which was held at Rabin Square in Tel Aviv, Israel on 10 April. On 14 April, Amaia y Alfred performed during the Eurovision in Concert event which was held at the AFAS Live venue in Amsterdam, Netherlands.

In addition to their international appearances, on 26 February, Amaia y Alfred performed an acoustic version of the song on talk show El Hormiguero on Antena 3, where they were guest interviewed. On 11 March, they performed the acoustic version on talk show Viva la vida on Telecinco, where they were likewise guest interviewed. On 15 March, they performed the song on the Premios Dial awards show at the Auditorio de Tenerife in Santa Cruz, aired live on Divinity. On 24 March, they performed the song on the La noche de Cadena 100 charity concert at the WiZink Center in Madrid, aired live on Divinity. On 25 March, they performed as guests on competitive dance reality television series Fama, a bailar, aired on #0. On 21 April, they performed during the Eurovision-Spain Pre-Party event which was held at the Sala La Riviera venue in Madrid. On 26 April, the special live concert event Amaia, Alfred y amigos, which aired on TVE's official website and the web platform Playz, centered on them, accompanied by guest performers Zahara and Love of Lesbian, among others. During the concert, Amaia y Alfred performed "Your Song", an English version of their entry.

At Eurovision 
The Eurovision Song Contest 2018 took place at the Altice Arena in Lisbon, Portugal and consisted of two semi-finals on 8 and 10 May and the final on 12 May 2018. According to Eurovision rules, all nations with the exceptions of the host country and the "Big Five" (France, Germany, Italy, Spain and the United Kingdom) are required to qualify from one of two semi-finals in order to compete for the final; the top ten countries from each semi-final progress to the final. As a member of the "Big Five", Spain automatically qualifies to compete in the final. In addition to their participation in the final, Spain is also required to broadcast and vote in one of the two semi-finals. At the semi-final allocation draw on 29 January 2018, Spain was drawn to vote in the first semi-final on 8 May; the country also performed in the first semi-final jury show on 7 May, and an extended clip of the performance was broadcast in the televised semi-final show the following evening.

In Spain, both semi-finals were broadcast on La 2, while the final was televised on La 1 with commentary by Tony Aguilar and Julia Varela. The Spanish spokesperson, who announced the top 12-point score awarded by the Spanish jury during the final, was Nieves Álvarez, for the second year in a row. For the first time, the final of the Eurovision Song Contest was broadcast live in cinemas across the country due to an agreement with cinema chain Cinesa. The Spanish song placed 23rd in the final with 61 points.

Staging and performance 
The staging director for the Spanish performance was Tinet Rubira, and Jordi Vives was the multi-camera director.

Voting

Points awarded to Spain

Points awarded by Spain

Detailed voting results
The following members comprised the Spanish jury:
 Rafael Cano Guisado (Rafa Cano; jury chairperson)radio presenter, radio DJ
 Carmen Brisa Fenoy Núñez (Brisa Fenoy)singer, composer, music producer
 Miriam Rodríguez Gallego (Miriam)artist, singer, guitar player
 Roi Méndez Martínez (Roi)singer
 Concepción Mendívil Feito (Conchita)singer, composer, songwriter

References

External links
 Official TVE Eurovision site

2018
Countries in the Eurovision Song Contest 2018
Eurovision
Eurovision